Mohammad Aslam (born 4 November 1979) is a Pakistani first-class cricketer who played for Peshawar cricket team.

References

External links
 

1979 births
Living people
Pakistani cricketers
Peshawar cricketers
Cricketers from Peshawar